Maravand (also Romanized as Marāvand; also known as Marvand) is a village in Vandadeh Rural District, Meymeh District, Shahin Shahr and Meymeh County, Isfahan Province, Iran. At the 2006 census, its population was 16, in 10 families.

References 

Populated places in Shahin Shahr and Meymeh County